Rear Admiral Eleanor V. Valentin was the first female flag officer to serve as director of the United States Navy Medical Service Corps. She assumed command of Navy Medicine Support Command and assumed duties as the 16th director of the Medical Service Corps on 1 October 2009.

Early life and education
Eleanor Vivian Valentin is a native of Seattle, Washington and former college cheerleader. After receiving her Bachelor of Science degrees in Zoology and Psychology at the University of Washington, she completed a Master's degree in Public Health (Health Policy and Planning), and a Master of Science degree in Public Health (Biostatistics) at the University of Hawaiʻi.

Naval career
In 1982 Valentin was commissioned as a lieutenant junior grade, Medical Service Corps, United States Navy, and for the next decade she served in a variety of department head and administrative officer positions at Naval Hospital San Diego; Admiral J. T. Boone Branch Medical Clinic in Norfolk, Virginia; Naval Medical Clinic Norfolk, Virginia; U.S. Naval Hospital Guam; Armed Forces Institute of Pathology in Washington, D.C.; and U.S. Naval Hospital Yokosuka, Japan.

Valentin served as director for Administration at Naval Medical Clinic in Pearl Harbor from 1994 to 1997. Following that duty, Valentin reported to the Bureau of Medicine and Surgery and became the branch head for TRICARE Marketing and Communications.

In October 2000, Valentin became the director, Regional Operations, in the Office of the Secretary of Defense (Health Affairs) TRICARE Management Activity. There, she led staff and joint service teams in developing plans and strategies to implement statutory and policy guidance for the delivery of healthcare services to eligible beneficiaries worldwide. From April 2003 until April 2006, she served as executive officer, Naval Hospital Corpus Christi, Texas; and from May 2006 through May 2008, she served as commanding officer, Naval Hospital/Health Clinic Cherry Point. Formerly, she served as chief of staff for Navy Medicine National Capital Area. Valentin was promoted to rear admiral on September 1, 2009. On October 1, 2009, Valentin assumed duties as chief, Medical Service Corps. With her promotion to flag rank, Valentin became the first female director of the Medical Service Corps to reach that milestone. Valentin retired in 2014.

See also
Women in the United States Navy

References
This article contains information from the United States Navy and is in the public domain.
Official United States Navy Biography 

1952 births
Living people
21st-century American women
University of Washington alumni
University of Hawaiʻi at Mānoa alumni
Military personnel from Seattle
American military personnel of Filipino descent
United States Navy rear admirals
Female admirals of the United States Navy
Recipients of the Defense Superior Service Medal
Recipients of the Legion of Merit
Recipients of the Meritorious Service Medal (United States)